Shannon Rutter Valentine (born January 31, 1959) served as the Secretary of Transportation for Virginia from 2018 to 2022. She was appointed Secretary of Transportation by Governor Ralph Northam in January 2018, and  oversaw a $5 billion multimodal transportation system crossing seven agencies with more than 10,000 employees. As Secretary, she also serves as Chair of the Commonwealth Transportation Board (CTB). Valentine served previously in the Virginia House of Delegates 2006–2010, representing the 23rd district, made up of the city of Lynchburg, Virginia and part of Amherst County, serving on the House Transportation and Courts of Justice Committees. Following an assignment as a Director of the Transportation Policy Council in 2013 for then Governor-elect Terry McAuliffe's transition team, Valentine was appointed as the Lynchburg District representative to the CTB in May 2014. During this time, she created the first Regional Connectivity Study in Virginia that correlated transportation decisions with workforce, business expansion and recruitment and investment, covering eight modes of transportation. Her legislative priorities focused on transportation, economic development, education, and ethics. She led bipartisan efforts to create transparent government, expand clean energy production, and invest in intercity passenger rail service for the first time in Virginia's history. She is a member of the Democratic Party.

Legislation
Valentine's legislative priorities included economic development, education, ethics in government, and health. She led the bipartisan, legislative effort to invest in intercity rail for the first time in Virginia's history, resulting in the Northeast Regional Rail Service. The NE Regional is the second fastest-growing rail line with the best record of cost-recovery in the United States. Her legislative record includes the creation of the first comprehensive study of Autism Services in Virginia, the establishment of the Economic Development Authority, and the granting of authority to localities to create Arts and Culture Districts for economic revitalization. In addition, Valentine focused on ethics in government through consistent sponsorship of a Bipartisan Redistricting Commission, and the transparency of recorded votes.

During her terms, Valentine served on the committees of Courts of Justice, Transportation, Science and Technology, and Judicial Review. She was appointed by Governor Timothy Kaine to serve on the Virginia Interagency Coordinating Council, the lead agency that manages early intervention for infants and children.

Electoral history

Virginia Secretary of Transportation
In January 2018, Valentine was appointed Secretary of Transportation by Governor Ralph Northam. As Secretary, she also serves as Chair of the Commonwealth Transportation Board (CTB).

Personal life
Valentine was born in Wilmington, Delaware and is married to Dr. Carl Michael Valentine. They have three children: Catherine, Jack, and Brooke. Valentine graduated from the University of Virginia with a bachelor's in economics. She also graduated from the Sorensen Institute for Political leadership and completed an Education for Ministry certificate course through Sewanee University's School of Theology.

Valentine was named 2017 Transportation Woman of the Year by WTS Central Virginia Chapter. She has also been honored with the Humanitarian Award by the Virginia Center for Inclusive Communities, Democracy in Action Award by the League of Women Voters, Freedom Fighter Award by the NAACP, Woman of the Year in Government by the YWCA, and the Commonwealth Autism Services Award.

References

External links

Project Vote Smart - Representative Shannon R. Valentine (VA) profile
Follow the Money - Shannon R. Valentine
2007

1959 births
Living people
People from Wilmington, Delaware
Politicians from Lynchburg, Virginia
Democratic Party members of the Virginia House of Delegates
Women state legislators in Virginia
State cabinet secretaries of Virginia
University of Virginia alumni
Sewanee: The University of the South alumni
21st-century American politicians
21st-century American women politicians